Yeison Javier Rivas Rivas (born 24 September 1987) is a Colombian hurdler. He represented his country in the 110 metres hurdles at the 2016 Summer Olympics without advancing from the first round. In addition, he won multiple medals on regional level.

His personal bests are 13.36 seconds in the 110 metres hurdles (+0.3 m/s, Medellín 2016) and 49.90 seconds in the 400 metres hurdles (Cali 2015). The latter is the current national record.

International competitions

References

1987 births
Living people
Colombian male hurdlers
Athletes (track and field) at the 2016 Summer Olympics
Olympic athletes of Colombia
Place of birth missing (living people)
South American Games bronze medalists for Colombia
South American Games medalists in athletics
Competitors at the 2014 South American Games
Sportspeople from Antioquia Department
21st-century Colombian people